Curly Bear Mountain is located in the Lewis Range, Glacier National Park in the U.S. state of Montana. Curly Bear Mountain is easily seen from the village of Saint Mary, Montana rising just west of Divide Mountain. The peak was named after Blackfoot warrior and historian Curly Bear (Kyáiyo-xusi).

See also
 Mountains and mountain ranges of Glacier National Park (U.S.)

References

Mountains of Glacier County, Montana
Mountains of Glacier National Park (U.S.)
Lewis Range